Villamejil is a municipality located in the province of León, Castile and León, Spain.  (data from INE), the municipality has a population of 545  inhabitants.

It is part of the historical region of La Cepeda.

Villages
Castrillo de Cepeda
Cogorderos
Fontoria de Cepeda
Quintana de Fon
Revilla
Sueros de Cepeda
Villamejil

References

External links 
La Maragatería y Cepeda

Municipalities in the Province of León
La Cepeda